Eleven Eleven may refer to:

 Eleven Eleven (Dave Alvin album)
 Eleven Eleven (Dinosaur Pile-Up album)
 Eleven Eleven (film), a 2018 American comedy film